Roxane Batoul Farmanfarmaian (born February 1955) is a British lecturer in international politics at the University of Cambridge.

Education

She obtained her BSc from Princeton University, and her MPhil and DPhil from the University of Cambridge.

Academic career

She teaches international politics on the Master of Studies programme at the Department of Politics and International Studies, University of Cambridge (POLIS) of the University of Cambridge, where she is also an Academic Director of the programme. She heads up the Global Politics and International Studies division of the Institute of Continuing Education of the University of Cambridge. She is a founding member of the POLIS' affiliated Centre for the International Relations of the Middle East and North Africa. From 2002 to 2005 she was Editor-in-Chief of the Cambridge Review of International Affairs.

Selected publications
 Blood and Oil: Memoirs of a Persian Prince. Prion Books, 1999. (With Manucher Farmanfarmaian) 
 War and Peace in Qajar Persia: Implications Past and Present. Routledge, 2008. (Editor) 
 "Media and the politics of the sacral: Freedom of expression in Tunisia after the Arab Uprisings", Media, Culture and Society, Vol 39, Issue 7, 2017.
 Iran's Rhetoric Aggression: Instrumentalising foreign policy through the media. Iran Media Program, Annenberg School for Communication, University of Pennsylvania, 2017.

References

External links

Living people
Princeton University alumni
Alumni of the University of Cambridge
1955 births
British political scientists
British women academics
Women political scientists
Academics of the Institute of Continuing Education